CFPM is an abbreviation which can refer to:
 Canadian Forces Provost Marshal
 cubic foot per minute - cubic foot flow rate